Punjab Lok Congress ( PLC; English: Punjab People's Congress) was an Indian regional political party, with its base in Punjab. It was founded by Amarinder Singh on 2 November 2021, following a split in Indian National Congress in Punjab, after he resigned as Chief Minister of Punjab and quit the Indian National Congress.

The party applied for its official registration with the Election Commission of India on 31 October 2021. On 28 December 2021, the party entered into an alliance with BJP and SAD(S) to contest 2022 Punjab Legislative Assembly election but failed to win any seat. On 19 September 2022, the Punjab Lok Congress merged into the Bharatiya Janata Party.

Notable members
 Amarinder Singh, party leader and president
 Luv Kumar Goldy
 Farzana Alam
 Amrik Singh Aliwal
 Ajit Pal Singh

References 

Indian National Congress breakaway groups
Political parties in India
Punjab Lok Congress